Cláudio Henrique Paiva Porfirio (born 18 November 2000), commonly known as Claudinho, is a Brazilian footballer who currently plays as a forward for Chapecoense, on loan from Cruzeiro.

Career statistics

Club

Notes

References

2000 births
Living people
Brazilian footballers
Association football forwards
Campeonato Brasileiro Série B players
Associação Ferroviária de Esportes players
Cruzeiro Esporte Clube players
Mirassol Futebol Clube players